Atrak Rural District may refer to:
 Atrak Rural District (Golestan Province)
 Atrak Rural District (North Khorasan Province)